This is a list of Jean-Michel Jarre compositions with multiple titles. Throughout the years, Jean-Michel Jarre has changed the titles to some of his original compositions, most often when performing them live. Jarre has also produced derivative compositions out of original works, using the same main melody. 

This list relates the original titles and the new titles (and shows the first instance of each, whether it was an album or a concert). Titles which are mere translations from another language are not included. The table can be alphabetically sorted by either column.

Lines with a * denote a derivative composition using the same main melody, not just a retitling.

Jarre, Jean-Michel compositions with multiple titles, List of